Hedquist is a Swedish surname. Notable people with the surname include:

Christopher Hedquist (born 1980), American skeleton racer
Lennart Hedquist (born 1943), Swedish politician

See also
Hedqvist

Surnames of Scandinavian origin